Spellcasting 101: Sorcerers Get All the Girls is a 1990 adventure game. It was the first installment of the Spellcasting series created by Steve Meretzky during his time at Legend Entertainment. All three games in the series tell the story of young Ernie Eaglebeak, a student at the prestigious Sorcerer University, as he progresses through his studies, learning the arcanes of magic, taking part in student life, and meeting beautiful women.

Story 
The games take place in a fictional world called Peloria, which appears like a modern society, however magic has the place of science. Peloria is mostly occupied by the Fizzbuttle Ocean with islands where the player travels throughout the game.

The player character is Ernie Eaglebeak, a teenager just out of high school living in the town of Port Gecko, pining for his sexy neighbour Lola Tigerbelly and struggling in a seriously bad relationship with his stepfather, Joey Rottenwood. A break-through in his miserable life comes when he gets accepted by the Sorcerer University, a prestigious university of magic. After a dashing escape from Rottenwood's custody, Ernie makes his way to SU and enrolls as a freshman.

The player learns magic, explores the university, reads the (rapidly deteriorating quality of) student newspaper, and can watch the University's (comedically pseudoscientific) lectures which provide some backstory concerning the mythology of Peloria. In the meantime, Ernie is interested to know females such as the university president's daughter Gretchen Snowbunny or Hillary, the young wife of his ancient advisor Otto Tickingclock. Suddenly SU gets attacked by mysterious foes who kidnap Tickingclock and take away the Sorcerer's Appliance, a powerful magical device which could become extremely dangerous in inappropriate hands. Ernie has to recover the device.

Equipped with his spell book and a magical guided surfboard, Ernie sets out on a mission to several islands on the Fizzbuttle Ocean in search for items that will aid him in getting into the sinister Fort Blackwand. And everywhere on the way he finds places where the Great Attachments required by the Sorcerer's Appliance to operate used to be located, but are gone now.

The islands visited are:
The Island of Lost Soles where the player restores the cursed souls of its inhabitants, 
The Island Where Time Runs Backwards where he has to work hard to avoid destroying the universe with a temporal paradox
The Island of Horny Women to finds out that there is such a thing as too much female attention
The Restaurant at the End of the Ocean where he witnesses the six stages of a life of a restaurant and 
The Island of the Gods to find out that goddesses need love too.

The player can learn spells and obtain items during his quest until Ernie can take on the challenge of the fort and confront the mastermind behind the theft of the Sorcerer's Appliance, who turns out to be Joey Rottenwood, his own stepfather. In a climactic final showdown Ernie manages to shut down the Appliance's self-destruct system by burying it, along with Rottenwood, under a pile of whale dung, and frees all the prisoners, including his presumed-dead real father.

At the epilogue, everybody returns to the University, where Ernie gets scolded for irresponsibility, given a hefty bill and abandoned by Lola, but he still gets to advance a year.

Technical details 

Spellcasting 101 is a text adventure game. However, much like all other games of this sort produced by Legend it runs in graphics mode (up to EGA) and takes advantage of certain EGA capabilities. While the traditional type-your-command approach is still possible, one can also assemble commands from words displayed in lists on the screen by clicking on them with the mouse; second, a graphical representation of the present location is also displayed on the screen and certain operations can be performed by clicking on different parts of the image as well. Finally, a compass rose is visible on the screen at all times, which in addition to enabling movement by clicking on it shows valid movement directions for the present location.

Unlike many text adventure games, Spellcasting 101 uses sound - with sound card support for music and sound effects played over the internal speaker using the RealSound technology.

Sexual content 

Similar to the famous earlier risqué work of Meretzky, Leather Goddesses of Phobos, Spellcasting 101 offers two gameplay modes of differing levels of sexual content. In the default, "nice" mode the females Ernie encounters have to be satisfied by such means as entertaining them, performing chores and so on, whereas in the "naughty" mode, such situations are resolved by sexual intercourse; the latter also replaces some of the images displayed by the game with more graphic (albeit not pornographic) versions.

Some of the sexual content is also present in "nice" mode and sometimes is important to gameplay. For example, at one point of the game, in preparation of a party, Ernie receives a spell from a fellow student whose purpose is to increase bust size, and promptly uses it to transform a stone bust into a makeshift ladder.

Copy protection
The game features a two-part copy protection system, with the first one involving filling in the gaps in Ernie's enrollment records with information from the registration form and class schedule enclosed with the game, at the time of him enrolling at the university, and the second using the enclosed map to obtain co-ordinates for various locations Ernie must visit on the Fizzbuttle Ocean. The word list interface makes breaking the copy protection by trial and error possible.

Main characters

Ernie Eaglebeak
Ernie Eaglebeak is the protagonist. A somewhat nerdy young man in his late teens, he wants to become a sorcerer and win the heart of Lola Tigerbelly. Although inexperienced, he is a good magician, whose passion for the arcane arts is rivaled only by his enormous sex drive. Unlike another Don Juan of the gaming world, Larry Laffer, most of the time he succeeds at his advances, with his "one true love" being seemingly the only woman he's never managed to get into bed.
Most other characters tend to get Ernie's name wrong, in which he is resembled by another adventure game protagonist, Guybrush Threepwood.

Lola Tigerbelly
Lola Tigerbelly is Ernie Eaglebeak's long-time neighbour and one true, secret love. The feeling is not mutual though, as the secrecy aside she is much more interested in athletic, jock-like and rich types than in her nerdy neighbor. She likes shopping and is very shallow, although beautiful.

Joey Rottenwood
Joey Rottenwood is Ernie Eaglebeak's stepfather. He passionately hates Ernie and makes his life as miserable as possible, up to the point of having him be essentially a prisoner at his own home, living in a locked room with a straw mat for bed and a chamberpot for other needs, and planning to thwart Ernie's plan to enroll at the Sorcerer University. Initially portrayed as a run-of-the-mill drunkard hating Ernie just for being another man's son, Rottenwood eventually turns out to be the arch-villain of the game, having sworn revenge against the Sorcerer University after being kicked out for cheating, and his attitude towards Ernie is a result of a prophecy he had once heard stating that young Eaglebeak would foil his plans.
There is much more to Joey Rottenwood than meets the eye. In spite of his superficially bad temper and a tendency to drink too much he appears to have almost infinite patience. Planning his revenge took him 30 years, not to mention the fact he went through the trouble of faking Ernie's father's death and marrying Ernie's mother to keep an eye on Ernie. Moreover, despite his abrupt departure from SU, Joey appears to possess quite good knowledge of magic. Much like Biff Tannen from the Back to the Future trilogy, he has a tendency to have his plans thwarted by getting buried under large amounts of dung.

Gretchen Snowbunny
Gretchen Snowbunny is a daughter of the SU president Aaron Snowbunny. Having been hit by a number of intoxication spells at a student party she attended, she asks Ernie to escort her somewhere she can rest. At Ernie's room, the two proceed to have sex, but as Gretchen passes out Ernie ceases his advances, being a gentleman. Gretchen has a key to her father's office, and Ernie takes advantage of this fact by stealing it while Gretchen is asleep.

Otto Tickingclock
Otto Tickingclock is a professor at the Sorcerer University and Ernie Eaglebeak's advisor. While apparently a great magician, his advanced age tends to get the better of him quite often by making him only loosely attached to reality and prone to falling asleep easily. Married to Hillary, whom he loves dearly.

Hillary Tickingclock
Hillary Tickingclock is the wife of Professor Tickingclock, several times younger than him. She has a habit of having sex with her dinner guests once her husband has fallen asleep.

Development
Following the closure of Infocom, designer Steve Meretzky began to work as a remote contractor for other game companies. During this period, Legend Entertainment founder Bob Bates contacted him about the possibility of developing a direct spiritual successor to Meretzky's Infocom title Leather Goddesses of Phobos, because of that game's commercial success. Meretzky felt that this was an unwise decision, and talked Bates into applying the comedy of Leather Goddesses to fantasy fiction, rather than repeating the earlier game's science fiction theme. Spellcasting 101 was the result of these discussions. The game's interface derived from Bates' work on the canceled Infocom game The Abyss, in development at the time of Infocom's closure. Legend subsequently chose to build on this foundation in its own games.

Meretzky personally disliked the interface of Spellcasting 101. He noted in retrospect, "The impetus for the interface was not a particular feeling that this was a good/useful/friendly/clever interface for playing adventure games, but rather a feeling that text adventures were dying, that people wanted pictures on the screen at all times, and that people hated to type."

Reception
In 1996, Computer Gaming World named Spellcasting 101 as the 11th funniest game ever.

See also 
 Spellcasting 201: The Sorcerer's Appliance
 Spellcasting 301: Spring Break

References

External links 
 
 

1990 video games
1990s interactive fiction
DOS games
DOS-only games
Erotic video games
Legend Entertainment games
Single-player video games
Video games about witchcraft
Video games developed in the United States